The Interim Legislature Parliament of Nepal, previously known as the Reinstated House of Representatives was the legislature of Nepal formed in the aftermath of the 2006 Nepalese revolution and the Comprehensive Peace Accord signed with the Communist Party of Nepal (Maoist).

Background 
King Gyanendra of Nepal had dissolved the House of Representatives on 21 May 2002. The parliament was reinstated on 24 April 2006 with 204 of the original members. The first meeting of the reinstated parliament was held four days later on 28 April 2006. On 15 January 2007, an interim legislative parliament was formed after the Comprehensive Peace Accord was between the Seven Party Alliance and the Communist Party of Nepal (Maoist). The Maoists were included in the new parliament and the total number of members was increased to 329.

Composition

Members

Changes

See also 

 2005 Nepal coup d'état
 2006 Nepalese revolution
 Nepalese Civil War
 Comprehensive Peace Accord

References 

Parliament of Nepal
Nepal